Tommy Robredo was the defending champion, but lost to Pablo Cuevas in the final, 3–6, 4–6.

Seeds
The top four seeds receive a bye into the second round. 

 Fabio Fognini (semifinals)
 Tommy Robredo (final)
 Marin Čilić (semifinals)
 João Sousa (second round)
 Lukáš Rosol (quarterfinals)
 Andreas Seppi (second round)
 Édouard Roger-Vasselin (first round)
 Carlos Berlocq (second round, withdrew)

Draw

Finals

Top half

Bottom half

Qualifying

Seeds

Qualifiers

Qualifying draw

First qualifier

Second qualifier

Third qualifier

Fourth qualifier

References
 Main Draw
 Qualifying Draw

ATP Vegeta Croatia Open Umag - Singles
2014 Singles